The late Ottoman genocides is a historiographical theory which sees the concurrent Armenian, Greek, and Assyrian genocides that occurred during the 1910s–1920s as parts of a single event rather than separate events, which were initiated by the Young Turks. Although some sources, including The Thirty-Year Genocide (2019) written by the historians Benny Morris and Dror Ze'evi, characterize this event as a genocide of Christians, others such as those written by the historians Dominik J. Schaller and  contend that such an approach "ignores the Young Turks' massive violence against non-Christians", in particular against Muslim Kurds.

Dutch–Turkish historian, professor of Genocide studies, and sociologist Uğur Ümit Üngör states that the mass violence and enslavement which occurred in the late Ottoman Empire and its successor state includes—but is not limited to:
the persecution of Muslims during the Ottoman contraction in the 19th and early 20th century, 
the Adana massacre of Christian Armenians in 1909,
the Greek genocide (1913–1922), 
the Assyrian genocide (1914–1924),
the Armenian genocide (1915–1917), 
the 1921 Koçgiri massacres of Muslim Kurdish rebels,
the "mass violence against Muslim Kurds from the 1925 Sheikh Said conflict to the 1938 Dersim massacre", 
the 1934 Thrace pogroms against Jews, 
the 1942 Varlık Vergisi tax levied on Non-Muslim citizens in Turkey, 
and the 1955 Istanbul pogrom against Christian Greeks and Armenians.
 
Other scholars sometimes also include the earlier Hamidian massacres of Christian Armenians in the 1890s or the deportations of Kurds between 1916 and 1934.

According to the journalist Thomas de Waal, there is a lack of a work similar to historian Timothy Snyder's Bloodlands (2010) that attempts to cover all of the mass violence in Anatolia and the Caucasus between 1914 and 1921. De Waal suggests that while "the genocide of 1915–1916 would stand out as the biggest atrocity of this period... [such a work] would also establish a context that would allow others to come to terms with what happened and why, and also pay homage to the many Muslims who died tragically in this era".

References

Bibliography

Ethnic cleansing in Asia
Ethnic cleansing in Europe
Genocides in Asia
Genocides in Europe
Genocide studies
Historiography of the Ottoman Empire
Massacres in the Ottoman Empire
Persecution of Christians in the Ottoman Empire
Persecution of Jews
Persecution of Kurds in Turkey
Persecution of Ottoman Muslims